Giacomo Pellegrini was a Roman Catholic prelate who served as Bishop of Fondi (1520–1537).

Biography
On 1 October 1520, Giacomo Pellegrini was appointed during the papacy of Pope Leo X as Bishop of Fondi.
He served as Bishop of Fondi until his resignation in 1537.

References 

16th-century Italian Roman Catholic bishops
Bishops appointed by Pope Leo X